Rear Admiral Ridley McLean, USN (10 November 1872 – 12 November 1933) was a two-star Admiral in the United States Navy. He was a Naval Academy graduate, the original author of the Navy's Bluejacket's Manual, and Judge Advocate General (JAG). He commanded a battleship in World War I, helped pioneer the naval use of shortwave communication, and led a submarine force and a battleship division.

Early life
Ridley McLean was born in Murfreesboro, Tennessee, to Thornton and Sallie (Ridley) McLean. Thornton, the son of Kentucky Congressman Finis Ewing McLean, was in the banking business in Pulaski.
Sallie died on November 22, 1872, just 12 days after giving birth to her only child. Thornton and Ridley soon left for California, lived there for a decade, and returned to Murfreesboro around 1883. Thornton died in 1887, leaving Ridley in the care of his maternal uncle, Army Captain B.L. Ridley, and his wife.

After two years at the University of Tennessee, Knoxville, Ridley was appointed to the U.S. Naval Academy by Congressman James D. Richardson. He entered on May 20, 1890, and graduated in 1894.

Military career

Early career
In February 1900, McLean was assigned to the gunboat  during the Reyes Rebellion in Nicaragua in February 1900. He was later attached to the staff of Rear Admiral Louis Kempff aboard his flagship, USS Kentucky, on which he participated in Boxer Rebellion in 1900 and the Philippine insurrection during 1901–1902.

In 1902, Lieutenant McLean wrote The Bluejacket's Manual for the United States Naval Institute, a book intended to provide information useful to new recruits and be a reference for every person in Naval service. In 1903, he contributed a chapter titled "Practical Naval Gunnery" to the Text Book of Ordinance and Gunnery.

This tour would be cut short upon receipt of new orders to the staff of the Commander in Chief of the Atlantic Fleet, Rear Admiral Charles S. Sperry.

In 1913, Commander McLean assumed what is normally a captain billet as Judge Advocate General of the US Navy, a position which entitled him the rank of captain in title only. He served in this role until December 1916, when he received orders to become commanding officer of the  through May 1917.

World War I
When World War I broke out, Commander McLean served as chief of staff for the Battleship Force 1, Atlantic Fleet, under VADM Albert Grant.

Post-war
At the same time he was permanently appointed to the rank of captain. In 1919, he was stationed at the Army War College in Washington D.C.

He was promoted to rear admiral in 1927 and assigned as Commander of Battleforce Submarines, using the submarine tender  as his flagship. Rear Admiral McLean fought for submarine sustainability and flexibility to fight long ways from home and for extended periods.

Personal life
In November 1916, Commander McLean married Olive Gale Hill and became stepfather to her two children (Olive Beatrice and Gale) from a previous marriage.

Death
The following day funeral services were held on board the Nevada while the flag-draped coffin of the Rear Admiral lay on the deck. Crews from all 50 warships in San Francisco were summoned to stand at attention during the service. His body was later interred at Arlington National Cemetery.

Dates of rank
Midshipman - 20 May 1890. Graduated class of 1894

Decorations and awards

United States awards

References

Further reading
McLean, R. The Bluejacket's Manual. Annapolis: Naval Institute Press, 1902.
Faram, Mark D. The Bluejacket's Manual Turns 100. All Hands June 2008.

1872 births
1933 deaths
People from Murfreesboro, Tennessee
Burials at Arlington National Cemetery
United States Naval Academy alumni
United States Navy admirals
Recipients of the Navy Cross (United States)